Weeping Pittosporum may refer to several Pittosporum species, including:

 Pittosporum phillyreoides, a Western Australian species
 Pittosporum angustifolium, an inland Australian species